Abdulwaheed Afolabi (born 8 December 1991) is a Nigerian professional football player who plays for Beninese club Loto-Popo FC.  Abdulwaheed has played for Russian Premier League team Kuban Krasnodar and Ukraine Premier League team Tavriya Simferopol. He has earned 14 caps and scored 3 goals for the Nigeria national youth teams.

Career
Afolabi went on trial with Black Leopards of the South African Premier Soccer League in August 2011, but negotiations broke down and he returned to Niger Tornadoes.
In March 2012, Afolabi signed a two-year contract with Ukrainian side Tavriya Simferopol. Afolabi then transferred to Russian Premier League side Kuban Krasnodar in August 2012, signing a four-year contract.
Afolabi made his debut for Kubam on 30 November 2012 in a game against FC Krasnodar.

In May 2017, Afolabi signing for Gombe United.

References

External links
 
 
 

1991 births
Sportspeople from Kaduna
Yoruba sportspeople
Living people
Nigerian footballers
Nigeria youth international footballers
Nigeria under-20 international footballers
Association football forwards
Niger Tornadoes F.C. players
SC Tavriya Simferopol players
FC Kuban Krasnodar players
Gabala FC players
FC Saxan players
Shooting Stars S.C. players
Gombe United F.C. players
Plateau United F.C. players
El-Kanemi Warriors F.C. players
Kwara United F.C. players
Nigeria Professional Football League players
Ukrainian Premier League players
Russian Premier League players
Azerbaijan Premier League players
Moldovan Super Liga players
Nigerian expatriate footballers
Expatriate footballers in Ukraine
Nigerian expatriate sportspeople in Ukraine
Expatriate footballers in Russia
Nigerian expatriate sportspeople in Russia
Expatriate footballers in Azerbaijan
Nigerian expatriate sportspeople in Azerbaijan
Expatriate footballers in Moldova
Nigerian expatriate sportspeople in Moldova
Expatriate footballers in Benin
Nigerian expatriate sportspeople in Benin